The Saab two-stroke was a two-stroke cycle, inline, two cylinder, and later three cylinder engine manufactured by Swedish automotive manufacturer Saab that was based on a design by German manufacturer DKW.

Two-cylinder
The first version was a  displacement straight-twin that was transversally mounted in the 1950–1956 Saab 92. It had some features only found in modern cars such as one ignition coil per cylinder.

Three-cylinder
It was used in the Saabs 93, 94 (Sonett I, with an engine tuned to ), Saab Sonett II, 95, 96, Saab Granturismo, the Saab Formula Junior and the Saab Quantum. The engine had a combined belt driven DC dynamo and a coolant water pump.

One of these carburettors was cut in half, thus providing three chokes with one for each of the three cylinders.

The same carburetor had been used in the Saab 96 Monte Carlo and Sport models. A common throttle shaft minimized carburetor synchronization problems.

This model had triple carburetors and a motor oil injection system, rather than oil pre-mixed with the petrol.

For model year 1966, the 'standard' 3-cylinder two-stroke engine had triple carburetors. From model year 1967 Saab began replacing it with the Ford Taunus V4 engine.

A special version known as the 'Shrike' was built for the United States' 1967 and 1968 model years.

Saab also made some experimental V6 engines, by mounting two three cylinder two-stroke engines together, at an angle. One had carburetors on the outside, while another was more conventional, with a carburetor in between the two blocks.

Production
Initially all two-stroke engines were built at the Saab Trollhättan plant, however in 1953 engines and gearbox production was moved to an old washing machine factory in Gothenburg.

When Saab discontinued production of the two stroke engine and replaced it with a four stroke V4 engine built by Ford in Germany, the plant in Gothenburg never again produced engines, however this was as the production capacity was needed for the increased demand of gearboxes due to the introduction of the Saab 99 a few years later.

Applications

Two-cylinder 

 Saab 92

Three-cylinder 

 Saab 93
 Saab 94 Sonett I
 Saab 95
 Saab 96
 Saab Formula Junior 
 Saab GT750 
 Saab Quantum
 Saab Sonett II
 Saab Monster 
 used twin 748 cc (45.6 cu in) two-stroke three-cylinder engines

See also

 Ford Taunus V4 
 the engine which replaced the Saab two-stroke
 Saab B engine
 Saab H engine

References

Saab engines
Gasoline engines by model
Two-stroke gasoline engines